Panegyra praetexta is a species of moth of the family Tortricidae. It is found in Nigeria.

The wingspan is about 18.5 mm. The costa marking on the forewings is yellowish with two distinct triangular concavities near the middle and some brown costal dots. The termen is finely edged with yellow and there is a brown dot at the apex. The remaining area is grey with four transverse red lines. The hindwings are cream.

Etymology
The species name refers to the forewing markings and is derived from Latin praetexta (meaning adorned at the edge).

References

Moths described in 2012
Tortricini